Women in Syria constitute 49.4% of Syria's population, and are active participants not only in everyday life, but also in the socio-political fields.

History 
In the 20th century a movement for women's rights developed in Syria, made up largely of upper-class, educated women. In 1919, Naziq al-Abid founded Noor al-Fayha (Light of Damascus), the city's first women's organization, alongside an affiliated publication of the same name. She was made an honorary general of the Syrian Army after fighting in the Battle of Maysaloun, and in 1922 she founded the Syrian Red Crescent. In 1928 Lebanese-Syrian feminist Nazira Zain al-Din, one of the first people to critically reinterpret the Quran from a feminist perspective, published a book condemning the practice of veiling or hijab, arguing that Islam requires women to be treated equally with men.  In 1930, the First Eastern Women's Congress was hosted in Damascus by the Syrian-Lebanese Women's Union.

In 1963 the Ba'ath Party took power in Syria, and pledged full equality between women and men as well as full workforce participation for women.

In 1967 Syrian women formed a quasi-governmental organization called the General Union of Syrian Women (GUSW), a coalition of women's welfare societies, educational associations, and voluntary councils intended to achieve equal opportunity for women in Syria.

The year 2011 marked the beginning of the Syrian Civil War, where many civilians have fallen victim to attacks targeted at hospitals, schools, and infrastructure. Extremist rebel groups, such as Jabhat al-Nusra and ISIS, have enforced strict policies restricting freedoms of women in territories they control.

After the outbreak of civil war, some Syrian women have joined all-female brigade units in the Syrian Arab Army, the Democratic Union Party, and the Islamic State of Iraq and the Levant, taking on roles such as snipers, frontline units, or police.

Legal rights 
While Syria has developed some fairly secular features during independence in the second half of the 20th century, personal status law is still based on Sharia and applied by Sharia Courts. Syria has a dual legal system which includes both secular and religious courts. Marriage contracts are between the groom and the bride's father, and Syrian law does not recognize the concept of marital rape.

Education 

The early schooling in Syria starts at six years old and ends at the age of eighteen. In Syrian universities, women and men attend the same classes. Between 1970 and the late 1990s, the female population in schools dramatically increased. This increase included the early school years, along with the upper-level schools such as universities and higher education. Although the number of women has increased, there are still ninety five women to every one hundred men. Although many women start going to school, the dropout rate for women is much higher than for men.

The literacy rate for women is 74.2 percent and 91 percent for men. The rate of females over 25 with secondary education is 29.0 percent.

Politics 

In Syria, women in Syria were first allowed to vote and received universal suffrage in 1953. In the 1950s, Thuraya Al-Hafez ran for Parliament, but was not elected. By 1971, women held four out of the 173 seats.

The current president of Syria is a male. There are also two vice presidents (including female vice president Najah al-Attar since 2006), a prime minister and a cabinet. As of 2012, in the national parliament men held 88% of the seats while women held 12%. The Syrian Parliament was previously led by female Speaker Hadiya Khalaf Abbas, the first woman to have held that position.

President Assad's political and media adviser is Bouthaina Shaaban. Shaaban served as the first Minister of Expatriates for the Syrian Arab Republic, between 2003 and 2008, and she has been described as the Syrian government's face to the outside world.

Of the civil society representatives among the 150 members of the Syrian Constitutional Committee, which was assembled in 2019 by the Syria Envoy of the United Nations, Syrian women comprise around 30%. Several renowned Syrian women, such as academic Bassma Kodmani, Sabah Hallak of the Syrian Women's League, the law professor Amal Yazji or the judge Iman Shahoud, sit on the committee's influential 'Small' or Drafting Body.

Role in economy and in the military 

In 1989 the Syrian government passed a law requiring factories and public institutions to provide on-site childcare.

However, women's involvement in the workforce is low; according to World Bank, as of 2014, women made up 16.4% of the labor force.

Women are not conscripted in the military, but may serve voluntarily. The female militias of Syria are trained to fight for the Syrian president, Bashar al-Assad. A video was found dating back to the 1980s with female soldiers showing their pride and protectiveness toward Assad's father. "Because women are rarely involved in the armed side of the revolution, they are much less likely to get stopped, searched, or hassled at government checkpoints. This has proved crucial in distributing humanitarian aid throughout Syria."

Women's health 

Between 2010 and 2015, the average life expectancy at birth for women in Syria is 77.7 years, compared with 74.5 years for men.

Impact of the conflict on Syria's women 
Since the conflict erupted in 2011, women in Syria, namely in conflict zones, have been facing violence, sexual assault, forced displacement, detension, domestic violence, child marriage and other violations of their rights.

During the years of conflict, insecurity and the economic collapse significantly increased the vulnerability of women and girls. In addition, many girls were left without schooling or access to healthcare services. The enrolment rate for primary education was 61% in 2013, with 61.1% of the total number being female, while for secondary education, the rate was 44% in 2013 - 43.8% for female.

In 2015, the United Nations gathered evidence of systematic sexual assault of women and girls by combatants in Syria, and this was escalated by the Islamic State (ISIL) and other terrorist organizations.

Crime against women

Honor killings
Honor killings take place in Syria in situations where women are deemed to have brought shame to the family, affecting the family's 'reputation' in the community. Some estimates suggest that more than 200 honor killings occur every year in Syria.

Forced and child marriage
The conflict in Syria has led to an increase in child marriages. The harsh living conditions, the insecurity, and the fear of rape, have led families to force their daughters into early marriages.
 As a result of early marriage, many girls in Syria are forbidden from completing their studies because when a girl is married she is only expected to be a good wife and a good mother as well. Child marriage can influence physical and mental health badly. Physical damage can be related to child bearing specially for women under 18 years old and the possibility for not being able to give birth later in life, and in extreme cases it can lead to death. Psychological factors can be defined as difficulties in interacting with the husband or not having enough awareness about marriage life and its responsibilities.

Domestic Violence 
A study covering the low-income women in Aleppo, an area where domestic abuse is more likely due to the tribal nature of the area, shows that physical abuse (battering at least 3 times in the last year) was found in 23% of the investigated women in 2003, 26% amongst married women. Regular abuse (battering at least once weekly) was found in 3.3% of married women, with no regular abused reported by non-married women. The prevalence of physical abuse amongst country residents was 44.3% compared to 18.8% amongst city residents. In most cases (87.4%) the abuse was inflicted by the husband, and in 9.5% of cases, the abuse was inflicted by more than one person. Correlates of physical abuse were women's education, religion, age, marital status, economic status, mental distress, smoking and residence.

Federation of Northern Syria - Rojava 

With the Syrian Civil War, the Kurdish populated area in Northern Syria has gained de facto autonomy as the Federation of Northern Syria - Rojava, with the leading political actor being the progressive Democratic Union Party (PYD). Kurdish women have several armed and non-armed organizations in Rojava, and enhancing women's rights is a major focus of the political and societal agenda. Kurdish female fighters in the Women's Protection Units (YPJ) played a key role during the Siege of Kobani and in rescuing Yazidis trapped on Mount Sinjar, and their achievements have attracted international attention as a rare example of strong female achievement in a region in which women are heavily repressed.

The civil laws of Syria are valid in Rojava, as far as they do not conflict with the Constitution of Rojava. One notable example for amendment is personal status law, in Syria still Sharia-based, where Rojava introduced civil law and proclaims absolute equality of women under the law and a ban on forced marriage as well as polygamy was introduced, while underage marriage was outlawed as well. For the first time in Syrian history, civil marriage is being allowed and promoted, a significant move towards a secular open society and intermarriage between people of different religious backgrounds.

The legal efforts to reduce cases of underage marriage, polygamy and honor killings are underpinned by comprehensive public awareness campaigns. In every town and village, a women's house is established. These are community centers run by women, providing services to survivors of domestic violence, sexual assault and other forms of harm. These services include counseling, family mediation, legal support, and coordinating safe houses for women and children. Classes on economic independence and social empowerment programs are also held at women's houses.

All administrative organs in Rojava are required to have male and female co-chairs, and forty percent of the members of any governing body in Rojava must be female. An estimated 25 percent of the Asayish police force of the Rojava cantons are women, and joining the Asayish is described in international media as a huge act of personal and societal liberation from an extremely patriarchical background, for ethnic Kurdish and ethnic Arab women alike.

The PYD's political agenda of "trying to break the honor-based religious and tribal rules that confine women" is controversial in conservative quarters of society.

Notable women 
 Hadiya Khalaf Abbas, Speaker of the People's Council of Syria (since 2016).
 Asya Abdullah is the co-chairwoman of the Democratic Union Party (PYD), the leading political party in Rojava.
 Asma al-Assad, the First Lady of Syria and the wife of the current President Assad
 Najah al-Attar, Vice President of Syria (since 2006).
 Randa Kassis, President of The Astana Platform of the Syrian opposition. 
 Suheir Atassi, Vice President of the opposition government.
 Samar Al Dayyoub, literary critic and writer
 Khawla Dunia, opposition activist and poet
 Îlham Ehmed is co-chairwoman of the Syrian Democratic Council.
 Hêvî Îbrahîm is the prime minister of Afrin Canton.
 Samira Khalil, dissident
 Ulfat Idilbi, best-selling Arabic-language novelist.
 Assala Nasri is a musical artist
Souad Nawfal, opposition activist and schoolteacher.
 Rasha Omran, poet
 Bouthaina Shaaban, Bashar al-Assad's political adviser and previous Minister of Expatriates
 Muna Wassef, theater, television, and film actress.
 Hediya Yousef is an ex-guerilla and co-chairwoman of the executive committee of the Federation of Northern Syria – Rojava.
 Razan Zaitouneh, human rights lawyer and activist.

References

External links 

 Survey: Discrimination against Women in Syrian Society (I/II). Awareness of Women Rights and Freedoms,  The Day After Association, August 2017 
 Survey: Discrimination Against Women in Syrian Society (II/II): Perception of Domestic Violence,  The Day After Association, August 2017 

 
Asian women